Constitutional Assembly elections were held in the newly-independent Republic of Montenegro on 10 September 2006. Prime Minister Milo Đukanović's Coalition for a European Montenegro (based around the Democratic Party of Socialists) won a majority in Parliament, winning 41 of the 81 seats. The opposition blocs together won 34 seats; 12 for the Serb List (SL) and 11 each for the Socialist People's Party (SNP)-led list and the Movement for Changes (PzP). Other seats were won by parties representing national minorities. As the opposition conceded defeat, DPS leader Đukanović stated "These elections showed that Montenegro is stable and firm on its European path."

Electoral system
Of the 81 seats in Parliament, 76 were elected by proportional representation in a nationwide constituency and five were elected in a special constituency for the Albanian minority. The electoral threshold was set at 3% and seats allocated using the d'Hondt method. Closed lists were used with a single list for both constituencies, although parties only had to award half their seats according to the order of the list, with the remaining half free for them to allocate.

Campaign
The main campaign issues were the economy, unemployment, the environment and European integration. The government campaigned on the recent successful independence referendum and international recognition of the country. Opposition parties criticised the performance of state institutions, as well as criticising their politicisation, but suffered from internal  divisions and the formation of new parties. Although the Đukanović government made a decision not to pay for parties' election campaigns using state funds, it eventually relented and funding was distributed equally between all parties.

Opinion polls
One opinion poll leading up to the elections suggested Đukanović's Democratic Party of Socialists (DPS) could win as much as 30%-45% of the vote, but that would still leave him needing a coalition partner. According to the same poll, the three pro-Serb opposition alliances could each win between 10% and 20% of the vote - potentially enough to unseat the Prime Minister if they succeed in uniting against him. All three claimed their main priority was to replace Đukanović. However, the Prime Minister himself did not rule out joining forces with the main opposition bloc, led by the Socialist People's Party.

Results

References

Elections in Montenegro
Montenegro
Parliamentary election
Montenegro